WSET-TV (channel 13) is a television station licensed to Lynchburg, Virginia, United States, serving as the ABC affiliate for the Roanoke–Lynchburg market. The station is owned by Sinclair Broadcast Group, and has studios on Langhorne Road in Lynchburg; its transmitter is located atop Thaxton Mountain, near Thaxton, Virginia.

History
Channel 13 began operations on February 8, 1953, as WLVA-TV from a transmitter on Tobacco Row Mountain west of Sweet Briar. The station was owned by Lynchburg Broadcasting Corporation, which also owned WLVA radio (580 AM). WLVA-TV also served Charlottesville, where residents reported good reception during testing, from this transmitter site. The station was originally a CBS affiliate, but also carried programs from ABC, NBC, and DuMont as well.

By the end of 1954, Roanoke and Lynchburg had been collapsed into a single market. Accordingly, channel 13 moved its transmitter and tower to Evington, Virginia in 1954 in an attempt to better serve Roanoke and the western part of the market. Since Roanoke was already served by NBC affiliate WSLS-TV (channel 10), WLVA-TV opted to become a primary ABC affiliate—Virginia's first, and the longest-tenured south of Washington, D.C. WLVA-TV and WSLS-TV split CBS programming until WDBJ-TV (channel 7) signed on from Roanoke in 1955.

The station made numerous requests to move its transmitter closer to the city. However, they were all turned down by the Federal Communications Commission (FCC) due to concerns about interference with co-channel WLOS-TV in Asheville, North Carolina and WOWK-TV in Huntington, West Virginia; in particular, the FCC believed that the Roanoke–Lynchburg and Huntington–Charleston markets were close enough that the two channel 13 transmitters had to be as far apart as possible to avoid interference. Its signal was so weak in Roanoke that ABC granted an affiliation to a second station in the market, WRFT-TV (channel 27), from 1966 through 1975.

In the early 1960s, the station set up translator W05AA to improve its signal in Roanoke. WLVA-TV was not alone in installing low-VHF Roanoke translators; the early 1960s also saw W02AE put on the air to translate WSLS-TV and W04AG put on the air to translate WDBJ-TV. In 1970, WLVA-TV sought to move its transmitter to Poor Mountain overlooking Roanoke, where the other major stations in the market operated their transmitters. This was once again turned down by the FCC, in order to protect WRFT-TV.

In 1965, Lynchburg Broadcasting merged with the Washington Star Company, which also owned WMAL-AM-FM-TV in Washington. Joe Allbritton purchased a controlling interest in the Star in 1975. By this time, however, the FCC had tightened its rules on cross-media ownership. Due to the manner in which Allbritton's purchase of the Star Company was structured, the FCC considered it to be an ownership change. It told Allbritton that he had to sell off either the radio or television stations. Allbritton chose to sell off the company's non-television assets, including WLVA radio, in April 1977. He then reorganized the former Star Company television stations as Allbritton Communications.

In September 1977, WLVA-TV changed its call letters to the current WSET-TV to coincide with its new branding, "NeWSET-13." The change was brought on by a now-repealed FCC regulation that stated that TV and radio stations in the same market, but with different ownership that must have different call signs.

Allbritton immediately set about finding a solution to channel 13's longstanding reception problems in the western portion of the market. In 1980, WSET won FCC approval to relocate its transmitter to Thaxton Mountain near Bedford, halfway between Roanoke and Lynchburg. WSET activated its new transmitter in 1982, which gave the station a clear signal in most of Roanoke for the first time ever. However, the FCC required WSET to significantly conform its signal to protect WOWK. As a result, some areas of the western part of the market, including parts of Roanoke itself, only got a grade B signal; they only got a clear signal from the station until cable arrived in the area a few years later.

WSET's newscasts primarily focus on the eastern part of the Roanoke–Lynchburg market. Beginning in October 2005, it was one of only two ABC affiliates in the Eastern Time Zone to air ABC's World News Tonight at 7 p.m.; WSB-TV in Atlanta is the other. However, WSET has returned the national program to the 6:30 p.m. time slot, shifting its local newscast to 7:00 p.m.

WSET was acquired by Sinclair Broadcast Group, based in suburban Baltimore County, Maryland, in August 2014 as part of Sinclair's purchase of Allbritton Communications.

Once and Again controversy
On March 11, 2002, WSET preempted an episode of Once and Again, "The Gay-Straight Alliance", which contained a scene in which two female characters kiss one another, and ran a prime time infomercial instead. WSET was the only ABC affiliate to preempt the episode. The decision, which station management refused to explain, provoked condemnation from GLAAD.

News operation

WSET presently broadcasts 27 hours of locally produced newscasts each week (with five hours each weekday and one hour each on Saturdays and Sundays).

On September 12, 2011, WSET began broadcasting its local newscasts in high definition, the station is the third in the Roanoke–Lynchburg market to make the transition to HD.

Former Good Morning America co-host and ABC World News anchor Charles Gibson began his television career at the station; he was a reporter/anchor for WLVA-TV during the late 1960s.

Notable current on-air staff
 Dave Walls – sports/news anchor and reporter

Notable former on-air staff
 Charles Gibson – reporter/anchor (WLVA-TV, late 1960s)

Technical information

Subchannels
The station's digital signal is multiplexed:

Analog-to-digital conversion
WSET-TV discontinued regular programming on its analog signal, over VHF channel 13, on June 12, 2009, the official date in which full-power television stations in the United States transitioned from analog to digital broadcasts under federal mandate. In October 2009, the station's digital signal relocated from its pre-transition UHF channel 34 to VHF channel 13. The station's over-the-air coverage in much of the western part of the market, especially the New River Valley, is somewhat marginal due in part to the mountainous terrain. W05AA was converted to digital operation in late 2009, which helped to fill in coverage holes in Roanoke.

Translator

Out-of-market coverage
WSET was available in Roxboro, North Carolina, on Charter Spectrum until 2020. It is carried in Yanceyville, North Carolina, on Comcast Cable and in Farmville, Virginia, on Shentel.

References

External links
Official website
RabbitEars.Info: Roanoke-Lynchburg Stations

SET-TV
ABC network affiliates
Charge! (TV network) affiliates
Comet (TV network) affiliates
TBD (TV network) affiliates
Television channels and stations established in 1953
1953 establishments in Virginia
Sinclair Broadcast Group